Embassy is a British brand of cigarettes, currently owned and manufactured by Imperial Tobacco.

History

Embassy was launched in 1914 by W.D. & H.O. Wills and was later relaunched as a coupon brand in 1962. When the Embassy brand was created, as a rebranding of Strand, more effort was put into developing and launching it than any other previous cigarette brand.

Embassy Filter was introduced in 1962 and was Britain's top-selling brand from 1964 until 1970, when it was overtaken by Player's No. 6. At its peak, it had 24% of the market in 1968.

In 2001, Embassy No. 1 had a 3.1% share of the UK licit cigarette market, and an estimated 4.8% share of the illicit market (based on seizures). In 2004, Embassy accounted for 24% of the premium segment of the UK market.

Two-time snooker world champion Alex Higgins sued the makers of Embassy in 1999, claiming that the encouragement from the sponsors to smoke Embassy cigarettes and the free cigarettes given to players, had contributed to him contracting throat cancer.

Embassy also has a sister brand, named Embassy Regal.

In 2019, the Embassy Number 1 Red changed blend (and taste), and had its price reduced. The Embassy Regal remained the same.

In April 2014, the last factory that still produced cigarettes in Nottingham, United Kingdom which also produced the Embassy cigarettes, was closed and production was moved to a foreign country such as Germany or Poland.

Various promotional material was made to sponsor Embassy cigarettes, such as magazine advertisements. A slogan used was "Inhale to your heart's content!"

Sponsorships

Formula 1

In 1973, Embassy became the title sponsor of the new Embassy Racing With Graham Hill (commonly known as Embassy Hill), Formula One motor racing team, founded by two-time World Champion, Graham Hill. Hill was also the teams lead driver for its first two years, but Embassy Hill did not enjoy success, securing only three points-scoring finishes in three years of racing. In 1975, Hill, his driver Tony Brise, and four other members of the team died in an aircraft accident. The team was closed afterwards.

Embassy sponsored a private-entry Shadow Racing car for Graham Hill who ran his car under the Embassy Hill banner in 1973.

Rallycross
The first two pan-European Rallycross series were both sponsored by W.D. & H.O. Wills and were run as 'Embassy – European Rallycross Championship', organised by the British Thames Estuary Automobile Club (TEAC). In 1973 it was Scotsman John Taylor who claimed the title 'Embassy – European Rallycross Champion', and in 1974 it was Austrian Franz Wurz, father of Alexander Wurz, who became Taylor's successor.

Snooker/darts
Embassy was the primary sponsor of the World Snooker Championships from 1976 to 2005 as well as the World Professional Darts Championship from 1978 until 2003, when the UK government banned all tobacco sponsorship in sport. Snooker and Formula 1 were the only two sports given a two-year extension until 2005.

Beauty pageants
Embassy also sponsored the Miss Ghana beauty pageant.

Markets
Embassy is mainly sold in the United Kingdom, but also was or still is sold in Ireland, Germany, Spain, Tanzania, Malawi, Kenya, South Africa, Mauritius, Pakistan, Malaysia, Canada, United States, Trinidad, Cyprus and Argentina.

Products

Current UK brands
Embassy Filter
Embassy Signature Gold (previously Embassy Number 1 Red) 
Embassy Signature Silver (previously Embassy Bright Blue) 
Embassy Signature Gold Superkings (previously Embassy Number 1 Red Superkings) 
Embassy Signature Silver Superkings
Embassy Signature New Crush (previously Embassy Crushball)
Regal Blue (Sister brand of Embassy)
Regal Filter (Sister brand of Embassy)

Discontinued UK brands

Belair Menthol
Embassy Envoy
Embassy Gold
Embassy Number 3
Embassy Number 5
Embassy Number 3 Extra Mild
Embassy Number 5 Extra Mild
Embassy Extra Mild
Embassy Number 1 Extra Mild
Embassy Premier with NSM (New Smoking Mixture)
Embassy Crushball

In December 2020, Embassy Number 1 Reds had its name changed to Embassy Signature Gold. These are weaker than the original Embassy Number 1. The price for a pack of 20 varies from £10.15-£11.00.

References

External links

 Sponsorship ban

Imperial Brands brands